This is a list of players who have played at least 200 games for one club in the Australian Football League (AFL), previously known as the Victorian Football League (VFL). This list includes only senior home-and-away matches and finals; representative games (i.e. State of Origin or international rules), pre-season and Night Series games are excluded from the totals.

Adelaide Football Club

Brisbane Lions

Carlton Football Club

Collingwood Football Club

Essendon Football Club

Fitzroy Football Club

Fremantle Football Club

Geelong Football Club

Hawthorn Football Club

Melbourne Football Club

North Melbourne Football Club

Port Adelaide Football Club

Richmond Football Club

St Kilda Football Club

Sydney Swans

West Coast Eagles

Western Bulldogs / Footscray Football Club

See also

List of AFL players to have played 300 games

References

External links
Fullpointsfooty article on 200 gamers

Australian rules football records and statistics
200 games for one club
History of Australian rules football